The following is a list of Indonesian feature films showing in theaters and those being channeled on video-on-demand services in 2023.

Box office collection
{| class="wikitable" style="text-align:left; font-size:100%; line-height:16px;" width="72%"
|-
! style="width:05%;" | Rank
! style="width:20%;" | Filem
! style="width:35%;" | Production
! style="width:20%;" | Viewer
! style="width:20%;" | Gross 
|-style="text-align:center; background:#9fc;"
! style="text-align:center;" | 1
|Puisi Cinta yang Membunuh
|Starvision Plus
|20.277
|Rp811 juta
|-style="text-align:center; background:#9fc;"
! style="text-align:center;" | 2
|Alena Anak Ratu Iblis
|Arjuna Mega Films
|20.112
|Rp805 juta
|-
|}

Film
January
 Puisi Cinta yang Membunuh (5 January) 
 Alena Anak Ratu Iblis(5 January) Balada Si Roy (19 January) Authobiography (19 January)

February
 Jalan yang Jauh, Jangan Lupa Pulang'' (2 February)

References 

Indonesia